Mineral Point is an unincorporated community in Cambria County, Pennsylvania, United States.

Great Flood of 1889
Mineral Point was destroyed in the Great Flood of 1889 on May 31 when the South Fork Dam failed, located on the south fork of the Little Conemaugh River. Mineral Point, located approximately one mile (1.6 km) below the Conemaugh Viaduct, was the first populated place to be hit by the rapid waters from the former Lake Conemaugh. About 30 families lived within the village of Mineral Point. After the flood, there were no structures, no topsoil, no sub-soil – only the bedrock was left. Approximately 16 citizens of Mineral Point perished in the flood.

References

Unincorporated communities in Cambria County, Pennsylvania
Unincorporated communities in Pennsylvania